Pierre Pay-Pay wa Syakasighe (born 10 July 1946, in Bukavu), is an economist and politician of the Democratic Republic of Congo. During his career, he held several positions relating to the Economy and Finance. He has served as Minister of Economy, Industry and Foreign Trade, Minister of Portfolio, Minister of Finance, CEO of Commercial Gécamines, and Governor of the Central Bank of Congo at the time of Zaire. Pierre Pay-Pay was a candidate in the 2006 Presidential Election for the Congolese Democratic Convention (CODECO), an electoral platform that brought together several political parties. He served in the National Assembly as a member following the 2006 Legislative Elections. He is currently National President of the Union of Christian Democratic Federalists (U.DE.C.F).

Pay-Pay is also a member of the political bureau for "Ensemble pour le changement", the opposition political coalition formed by former governor of Katanga Moïse Katumbi to support his presidential bid in the upcoming 2018 presidential election.

See also
List of governors of the Banque Centrale du Congo

References

1946 births
Living people
Governors of the Banque Centrale du Congo
Finance ministers of the Democratic Republic of the Congo
Members of the National Assembly (Democratic Republic of the Congo)
Federalist Christian Democracy – Convention of Federalists for Christian Democracy politicians
Candidates for President of the Democratic Republic of the Congo
Democratic Republic of the Congo exiles